Driven from Paradise (translit. Tarid el firdaos) is a 1965 Egyptian drama film directed by Fatin Abdel Wahab. It participated in the 4th Moscow International Film Festival.

Cast
 Farid Shawqi
 Samira Ahmed
 Mohammed Tawfik
 Nagwa Fouad
 Aziza Helmy

References

External links
 

1965 films
1965 drama films
1960s Arabic-language films
Films directed by Fatin Abdel Wahab
Egyptian drama films
Egyptian black-and-white films